"Tum Hi Ho" is an Indian Hindi-language romantic song from the 2013 Indian movie Aashiqui 2, sung by Arijit Singh. It was composed and written by Mithoon. Picturised on Aditya Roy Kapur and Shraddha Kapoor, it was released by Bhushan Kumar under T-Series, leading to its popularity and remaining in the top 10 of Planet Bollywood for eight weeks and capturing the first spot on the Top 20 of MTV India for seven weeks. It has garned 700+ million views on  YouTube .

Background and release 
The song had been recorded by Mithoon two years before its release with Arijit Singh's vocals. Mithoon recalls, 

The song was released on 23 March 2013, along with the teaser of the music video by T-Series, followed by its release the next day. It garnered over 1,852,947 views within 10 days of launch.

Critical reception 
The song received acclaim from critics. Glamsham gave a rating of 5 stars out of 5 and said, "It is indeed an exhilarating experience listening to the songs of Aashiqui 2 and in this age of mundane and average/repetitive musical fares that are being churned out, the audio of Aashiqui 2 is surely a treat for all music buffs. "Tum Hi Ho" and "Sunn Raha Hai" (both versions) are our favourites, but "Chahun Main Ya Naa" and "Piya Aaye Na" end up as a close second. A chartbusting musical experience indeed." Planet Bollywood commented "The song has all the hallmarks of a Mithoon creation; it's soulful, extremely touching and of course it's dripping with melody. The piano, strings, and beats are very effective in creating an eerie romantic atmosphere for the singer to transform the song and Arijit Singh does that magnificently." Koimoi commented, "Album opens with a heavy and deep voice of Arijit Singh crooning "Tum Hi Ho". Composer Mithoon has penned the lyrics for this passionate ballad which might remind one of the rest of the Bhatt music that has been heard in abundance in recent times, right from Raaz 3 to Jism 2. Arijit's voice does touch the listener's heart and lyrics support the passion as well." IANS wrote, "The album opens with "Tum Hi Ho". Sung by Arijit Singh, it starts slowly but gradually picks up the pace. Melodious and rhythmic, it has meaningful lyrics. A happy romantic number, it brings the story of a lover sharing his happiness with the world " while some critics call it a self-centred narration of a lover's heart along with a darkness.

Success and impact 
The song garnered approximately 5 million views on YouTube within 10 days of release, which helped in the marketing of the film. Various versions of the song were uploaded by amateur singers, guitarists and DJs on social networking sites. Aashiqui 2 had less than 3 weeks for the promotion, unlike other Bollywood movies which indulge in months of promotion. However, it was Tum Hi Ho which became a rage and created instant buzz for the film in the market. The movie upon release, became a blockbuster, earning 132 crores in an unimaginable 11-week run worldwide and was termed as one of the best trending films of Indian Cinema. The song won Most Entertaining Song of the year at the Big Star Entertainment Awards 2013. The music video on YouTube has garnered 281 million views as in March 2021.

Awards and nominations

Meri Aashiqui 

A duet version of the song, "Meri Aashiqui" was also released in the soundtrack album and later featured in the film itself. Composed and written by Mithoon, it is sung by Palak Muchhal, along with Arijit Singh reprising his vocals.

Background 
Palak Muchhal had already recorded vocals for the song "Chahun Main Yaa Naa" with Jeet Gannguli for the film when she got a call from Mithoon two days later to record "Meri Aashiqui". She notes, "It was such a divine composition with beautiful lyrics".

Critical Reception 
The song had mostly positive reviews, praising Muchhal's vocals along with Singh's. Koimoi comments, "Palak Muchhal opens the title track Meri Aashiqui slowly and deeply. Arijit adds the base with his voice. It’s a voice-dominated song with slow beats at the background. It should work with the listeners and also climb charts." Planet Bollywood comments, "There’s a reprise version of this song later in the album called “Meri Aashiqui” where Arijit is joined by Palak Muchal who sounds incredibly like Shreya Ghoshal which is high praise indeed. Nevertheless it’s super hit material just like the original." IANS writes, "The song has everything in sync - from lyrics, singers to the music. Go for this one."

Accolades

Other versions 
"Tum Hi Ho" and "Meri Aashiqui" were remade in Telugu as "Pranamaa Naa Pranamaa" and "Manase Pedavina" respectively, for the 2014 film Nee Jathaga Nenundali; which is an official Telugu remake of Aashiqui 2. The lyrics were penned by Chandra Bose. Arijit Singh once again provides vocals for both songs in Telugu, with Arpita Chakraborty replacing Palak Muchhal for the duet version.

Shreya Ghoshal and Armaan Malik performed the mixtape version of this song on T-Series Mixtape as "Tum Hi Ho/Rehnuma", a medley of "Tum Hi Ho" and "Rehnuma" from the film Rocky Handsome, which was also sung by Shreya Ghoshal along with Inder Bawra and composed by Sunny and Inder Bawra. The music of this version was directed by Abhijit Vaghani.

Controversy 
In December 2018, American rapper T-Pain was accused of plagiarizing the composition on his single called "That's Yo Money". However the music video has been taken down.

References

External links 
 

2013 songs
Songs written for films
Hindi film songs
Arijit Singh songs
Songs written by Mithoon
T-Series (company) singles